In enzymology, a caffeate O-methyltransferase is an enzyme that catalyzes the chemical reaction

S-adenosyl-L-methionine + 3,4-dihydroxy-trans-cinnamate  S-adenosyl-L-homocysteine + 3-methoxy-4-hydroxy-trans-cinnamate

Thus, the two substrates of this enzyme are S-adenosyl methionine and 3,4-dihydroxy-trans-cinnamate (caffeic acid), whereas its two products are S-adenosylhomocysteine and 3-methoxy-4-hydroxy-trans-cinnamate (ferulic acid).

This enzyme belongs to the family of transferases, specifically those transferring one-carbon group methyltransferases.  The systematic name of this enzyme class is S-adenosyl-L-methionine:3,4-dihydroxy-trans-cinnamate 3-O-methyltransferase. Other names in common use include caffeate methyltransferase, caffeate 3-O-methyltransferase, and ''S-adenosyl-L-methionine:caffeic acid-O''-methyltransferase.  This enzyme participates in phenylpropanoid biosynthesis.

Structural studies 

References 

 
 
 

EC 2.1.1
Enzymes of known structure
O-methylated hydroxycinnamic acids metabolism